The John Edmiston House is a historic house on Main Street in Canehill, Arkansas.  Built in 1896, this -story wood-frame structure is the small community's architecturally most elaborate Victorian house.  It has asymmetrical massing and a busy and varied roofline, with numerous projections, gables, and porches, all characteristic of the Queen Anne and Eastlake styles.  The builder, John Edmiston, was a prominent local businessman and banker.

The house was listed on the National Register of Historic Places in 1982.

See also
National Register of Historic Places listings in Washington County, Arkansas

References

Houses on the National Register of Historic Places in Arkansas
Queen Anne architecture in Arkansas
Houses completed in 1896
Houses in Washington County, Arkansas
National Register of Historic Places in Washington County, Arkansas
Stick-Eastlake architecture in the United States
Victorian architecture in Arkansas
1896 establishments in Arkansas